The 3rd Miss Chinese International Pageant, Miss Chinese International Pageant 1991 was held on February 10, 1991 in Hong Kong. The pageant was supposed to be held in the fall/winter of 1990, but delayed until February 1991 to coincide with Chinese New Year. Since then, the pageant has been held near Chinese New Year up till 2010, when the pageant reverted to being held in the autumn. The pageant was organized and broadcast by TVB in Hong Kong. Miss Chinese International 1989 Kit Wong of Sydney, Australia crowned Singapore's Yen-Thean Leng as the new winner. Five years later, Singapore would win the pageant again.

Pageant information
The theme to this year's pageant continues to be "The Traditions of the Dragon, The Embodiment of Beauty" 「龍的傳統  俏的化身」.  The Masters of Ceremonies were Anthony Chan Yau and Philip Chan.  The performing guests includes actor Woo Fung; canto-pop singers Hacken Lee, Vivian Chow, Leon Lai, Shirley Kwan, Sam Tsang, David Lui; Miss Hong Kong 1989 and Miss Chinese International Pageant 1989 first runner-up Monica Chan and Miss Hong Kong 1989 second runner-up Isabel Leung.

Results

Special awards
Miss Friendship: Deanna Leung 梁慧儀 (Seattle)
Miss Oriential Beauty: Ann Mah 馬彩燕 (Edmonton)
Miss Charm: Ann Mah 馬彩燕 (Edmonton)

Contestant list

Crossovers
Contestants who previously competed or will be competing at other international beauty pageants:

Miss Universe
 1991: : Anita YUEN

External links
 Johnny's Pageant Page - Miss Chinese International Pageant 1991

TVB
1991 beauty pageants
1991 in Hong Kong
Beauty pageants in Hong Kong
Miss Chinese International Pageants